is a fictional character from Square Enix's video game franchise Kingdom Hearts, prominently featured in Kingdom Hearts Birth by Sleep as one of the game's three playable protagonists. He appears in-game as a pupil of Master Eraqus who trains alongside his friends Aqua and Ventus to become a master of the Keyblade weapon.

Terra's storyline highlights his struggle to tame his inner darkness, a negative attribute that serves as a source of both power and corruption for him.

Series director Tetsuya Nomura designed Terra's character when preparing the secret endings of Kingdom Hearts II and Kingdom Hearts II Final Mix. He was developed to be reminiscent of series antagonist Xehanort as he appears in previous titles, as well as having a connection with Riku, one of the series' main characters. Ryōtarō Okiayu has done the voice of Terra in Japanese and Jason Dohring in the English version.

Video game publications gave mixed responses to Terra's character, with many noting his similarity to the Final Fantasy VII character Zack Fair, and later commenting on his naive portrayal in Birth by Sleep.

Appearances
An early character concept for Terra first appeared in the secret endings of Kingdom Hearts II and Kingdom Hearts II Final Mix, titled "The Gathering" and "Birth by Sleep", respectively. Additionally, the latter game and remakes include the Lingering Will as an optional boss that is accessible upon clearing the game's story. The Lingering Will searches for a person he chose and instead fights Sora believeing him to be Xehanort.

The prequel Birth by Sleep introduces Terra as an apprentice Keyblade wielder who trains alongside Aqua and Ventus at the Land of Departure. Early in the game, Terra is denied the rank of Keyblade Master when his mentor and father figure, Master Eraqus, detects a strong presence of darkness in his heart. Disheartened, Terra is given a chance to redeem his failure when dispatched to eliminate an insurgence of dark creatures called the Unversed in neighboring worlds. Periodically, the vagabond Master Xehanort appeals to Terra to channel the power of darkness freely, creating a schism between him and his friends as they grow troubled by his actions. This eventually leads Terra to clash with Eraqus when he finds his master inexplicably attacking Ventus, which ends with Xehanort vanquishing the weakened Eraqus. Realizing the entire conflict was engineered to stimulate his inner darkness, Terra confronts Xehanort at the Keyblade Graveyard and succumbs to rage, allowing Xehanort to transplant his heart into the youth's body to prolong his own life. The process that turns Terra into Terra-Xehanort also transfers his disembodied mind into his discarded armor, becoming the Lingering Will that defeats Xehanort and remains in the Keyblade Graveyard. Following Terra-Xehanort's battle with Aqua, Terra's heart begins resisting Xehanort with the aid of Eraqus's heart, revealed to have entered Terra's own before his apparent death, while Xehanort ends up in an amnesic state by the time Ansem the Wise took him as an apprentice.

Terra makes an appearance in Kingdom Hearts Coded alongside various other suffering characters who are bound to Sora's heart. He is also mentioned in the secret ending of the remake Re:coded, where Mickey Mouse and Yen Sid discuss his and Ventus' whereabouts following the events of Birth by Sleep. Terra briefly appears in Kingdom Hearts 3D: Dream Drop Distance, first during Sora's dream where Sora's friends, Riku and Kairi, are transformed into Terra and Aqua; and again when Sora declares his pride in being connected to many Keyblade wielders. A vision of Terra makes an appearance in Kingdom Hearts 0.2: Birth by Sleep – A Fragmentary Passage, a part of Kingdom Hearts HD 2.8 Final Chapter Prologue, while Aqua explores the realm of darkness. In Kingdom Hearts III, Terra's restored body at the Keyblade Graveyard as one of Xehanort's thirteen "seekers of darkness" in his plan to open Kingdom Hearts, serving again as a vessel for Xehanort's heart from the past; the Lingering Will also appears, summoned by Naminé after Sora uses the power of waking to undo his allies' initial defeat. During Sora, Aqua, and Ventus's battle against Terra-Xehanort, Terra's heart awakens from within Terra-Xehanort's "guardian" Heartless, which aids Sora in banishing Xehanort's heart and restoring Terra to his true self. After reuniting with Aqua and Ventus, and later aiding in keeping Kingdom Hearts closed, Terra releases Eraqus's heart and spirit, who persuades the dying Xehanort to surrender peacefully. Afterwards, Terra and his friends return home before joining their allies in celebration on the Destiny Islands.

Terra's role from Birth by Sleep is reprised in Tomoko Tanemaki's light novels of the game. Additionally, the final chapter shows the Lingering Will fighting Sora from Kingdom Hearts II Final Mix.

Terra also makes an appearance in Super Smash Bros. Ultimate as a spirit.

Creation and development

Although Terra, Ventus and Aqua first appeared in the secret ending of Kingdom Hearts II wearing armor, director Tetsuya Nomura still had not designed their final look, having only thought about their story. Despite not revealing their identities, Nomura still said that they are characters from the past from the Kingdom Hearts series. Following the release of the Kingdom Hearts II Final Mix, Nomura revealed a connection between them and the game's villain Xemnas, but wanted to leave it up to people's imaginations as he still could not reveal their identities. Terra's face was first shown in the 2006 Tokyo Game Show in which he was described as an avenger against Xehanort. Nomura also confirmed that the Lingering Will was connected with Terra. He also stated that his name, meaning "earth" from Latin, follows the "land" theme Riku represents, as well as connecting him with the other main characters' names from the series. In October 2007, Nomura was asked if the Lingering Will was actually Terra due to their similarities, but he responded it was still uncertain. When asked about the Will's true nature after being revealed to contain Terra's memories, Nomura stated it was not a Heartless. Nomura expressed that the fans liked the inclusion of the Will's battle due to his challenging difficulty, which led the staff to design another hard boss character for Birth by Sleep.

Out of the three protagonists from Birth by Sleep, Terra's design was the only one Nomura decided on from the start, with Nomura stating Terra would be designed younger than shown in previous games. Japanese-inspired designs were incorporated into Terra's outfit based on the "master and apprentice" relationship featured in the game. Nomura had troubles designing Terra's, Ventus's and Aqua's armors due how they would be able to summon them. Therefore, an "X" was added to their clothes as a means of activating the armors as well as due to the fact it was one of the game's keywords. Ever since development of Birth by Sleep started, the staff already decided that the three stories would be told in separate scenarios, with Terra's story being the first one written. Nomura wrote Terra's conversation with Riku early on development, wishing to explain the reason for Riku's ability to use the Keyblade, and he requested the staff in charge to make it into the game. The staff also wanted to emphasize the lack of coincidences in the series, leading to the characters' interaction between the three scenarios. Nomura recommended players to first play as Terra in Birth by Sleep in order to understand the story better. Terra's gameplay was also described by Nomura as "heavy" in comparison to Ventus's and Aqua's.

To expand the connection between Terra and Riku, scenes foreshadowing future events involving Riku from Terra's perspective were added to the game, though Nomura has stated that these scenes are not of a precognitive nature. Nomura expects that in future games, the connection between both of them would be expanded. Ryōtarō Okiayu was chosen as Terra's Japanese voice actor as the staff wanted an actor who sounded similar to Chikao Ōtsuka, Xehanort's original voice actor, and Akio Ōtsuka, Xehanort's current voice actor who also voiced the villain while using Terra's body. The staff found Chikao's was a dry sort of voice, Akio's a deep, resonating sort of voice, and liked how Okiayu bore elements from both actors.

Reception

When Terra's character was first revealed, 1UP.coms Jeremy Parish found him to be very similar to Zack Fair from Final Fantasy VII to the point where he wondered whether he would actually be Zack. However, when considering Terra's weapon being a Keyblade in contrast to all the other Final Fantasy characters shown in previous Kingdom Hearts games, he thought he may not be Zack. Selecting Terra for a demo of Birth by Sleep IGNs Ryan Clements agreed with Parish, finding only minor differences between their outfits.

Terra's role in Birth by Sleep has received mixed critics with Adam Ghiggino from PALGN criticizing his naive personality when finding the three protagonists unappealing. VideoGamer.com writer Emily Gera stated that players may know little about them due to their role in Kingdom Hearts II, but with Birth by Sleep, players will be able to know about them. Writing for GamesRadar, Crhis Antista commented that he did not understand the importance of him and the other characters being briefly featured in Kingdom Hearts II, although it could be explained once the player finishes Birth by Sleep. PlayStation LifeStyles Thomas Williams found the trio as welcome additions to the franchise, finding their stories enjoyable even though the three travel to the same worlds. X-Play found Terra to be very similar to Riku due to his personality and vulnerability to evil's allure. Kevin VanOrd of GameSpot criticized Jason Dohring's work as Terra's English voice actor, saying he "can't express angst, excitement, sincerity, or any other emotion", affecting the storyline. Vanord also pointed this out when Terra interacts with Disney characters, finding the latters' voice actors to be "uniformly excellent and absolutely comparable to the original source." Bob Miur from Destructoid compared Terra's storyline with the film Star Wars: Episode III – Revenge of the Sith due to the struggles he faces, and found that gamers familiar to the series may realize that his fate in the game "won't turn out to be very pretty." Miur also commented on Dohring's work, praising how he makes Terra "tortured and conflicted", but still criticizing the result. UGO Networks listed Terra's Helmet nineteenth on their list of "The Coolest Helmets and Headgear in Video Games", stating "For a minute, but only a minute, the two-horned helmet will get you feeling like the Keyblade is a viable weapon." In a Famitsu poll, Terra was voted as the fifth most popular Kingdom Hearts character. Kimberly Wallace from Game Informer expected Terra, alongside his friends, to appear in Kingdom Hearts III.

In the book Kingdom Hearts II (Boss Fight Books Book 16), Alexa Ray Corriea argues Terra managed to see Riku's full potential when giving him the power to wield the Keyblade, claiming that while Riku was a child when they first met, Terra manages to see through Riku's original intention of wanting to protect others which might come across as a retcon the narrative said when contrasting with previous installments.

References

Characters designed by Tetsuya Nomura
Fictional armour 
Fictional aviators
Fictional bodyguards in video games
Fictional characters who can manipulate darkness or shadows
Fictional characters with earth or stone abilities
Fictional empaths
Fictional explorers in video games
Fictional knights in video games
Kingdom Hearts original characters
Male characters in video games
Square Enix protagonists
Video game bosses
Video game characters introduced in 2010
Video game characters with superhuman strength